The Index Translationum is UNESCO's database of book translations. Books have been translated for thousands of years, with no central record of the fact. The League of Nations established a record of translations in 1932. In 1946, the United Nations superseded the League and UNESCO was assigned the Index. In 1979, the records were computerised.

Since the Index counts translations of individual books, authors with many books with few translations can rank higher than authors with a few books with more translations. So, for example, while the Bible is the single most translated book in the world, it does not rank in the top ten of the index. The Index counts the Walt Disney Company, employing many writers, as a single writer. Authors with similar names are sometimes included as one entry, for example, the ranking for "Hergé" applies not only to the author of The Adventures of Tintin (Hergé), but also to B.R. Hergehahn, Elisabeth Herget, and Douglas Hergert. Hence, the top authors, as the Index presents them, are from a database query whose results require interpretation.

According to the Index, Agatha Christie remains the most-translated individual author.

Statistics
Source: UNESCO

Top 10 Author

Top 10 Country

Top 10 Target Language

Top 10 Original language

See also

 UNESCO Collection of Representative Works, UNESCO's program for funding the translation of works
 List of literary works by number of translations

References

External links
Index Translationum
Index Translationum: Statistics - Search forms

Online databases
Indexes
Translation databases